John Salter (born March 21, 1985) is an American mixed martial artist currently competing in the Middleweight division of Bellator. A professional competitor since 2007, he has also competed for the UFC and Strikeforce, King of the Cage, and the AFC. As of February 7, 2023, he is #3 in the Bellator Middleweight Rankings.

Background
John Salter began training in wrestling at age 12, going on to win a 2002 Alabama state title while in high school. He went on to attend Lindenwood University in St. Louis, Missouri, where he won the 2007 NAIA National Wrestling Championship at 174 lbs. Following college, Salter won various national grappling tournaments, including the 2007 NAGA Nationals (No-Gi, middleweight) Expert Division, as well as the 2007 Casca Grossa (No-Gi, 175 lb and up) Professional Division. In addition, Salter began training kickboxing and Brazilian Jiu-Jitsu.

Mixed martial arts career

Early career
Salter made his amateur MMA debut in 2007 and compiled an undefeated record of 7–0. He made his professional debut in March 2009 at middleweight and has maintained a record of 17–4.

Ultimate Fighting Championship
On January 11, 2010, Salter made his UFC debut, stepping in as a last-minute replacement for Mike Massenzio against Gerald Harris at UFC Fight Night 20. Salter lost the fight due to TKO (strikes) in the third round.

Salter was scheduled to face Nick Catone on May 8, 2010 at UFC 113, but Catone was forced off the card with an injury and instead faced UFC veteran, Jason MacDonald. After 2:42 of the first round, MacDonald suffered a suspected broken ankle and Salter was declared the winner by TKO (injury).

Salter was expected to face Phil Baroni on August 28, 2010 at UFC 118, however Baroni was forced off the card with an injury. Late replacement Dan Miller defeated Salter via guillotine choke in the 2nd round.

Salter was released from the UFC with a 1–2 record.

Strikeforce
Salter was expected to make his Strikeforce debut against undefeated Yancy Medeiros at Strikeforce Challengers: Woodley vs. Saffiedine on January 7, 2011, but Medeiros was forced from the bout with an injury.  As a result, Salter was pulled from the card, but later re-added, fighting Casey Huffman who he defeated via TKO due to strikes in the 1st round.

Armageddon
Salter defeated former UFC fighter Kalib Starnes in the main event of AFC 6: Conviction for Armageddon FC in Victoria, BC, Canada, on June 18. This fight was for the AFC middleweight title belt.

Bellator MMA
In his Bellator MMA debut, Salter faced Dustin Jacoby on January 16, 2015 at Bellator 132. He won the fight via submission in the second round. On June 17, 2016 John faced the former Middle Weight title holder Brandon Halsey on the main card for Bellator 156. Salter won via submission by triangle choke.

Salter faced Kendall Grove at Bellator 181 on July 14, 2017. He won the fight via technical submission in the first round.

Salter was expected to face Anatoly Tokov at Bellator 188 on November 16, 2017. However, Tokov pulled out of the bout due to an ACL injury and was replaced by Jason Radcliffe. Salter won the fight via submission in the first round.

Salter was expected to face Rafael Lovato Jr. at Bellator 198 on April 28, 2018. However, Salter was pulled by the Illinois Athletic Commission due to an eye issue on April 24 and replaced by Gerald Harris.

Salter faced Rafael Lovato Jr. on September 21, 2018 at Bellator 205.  He lost the fight via a submission.

Salter stepped in to replace Melvin Manhoef against Chidi Njokuani on November 30, 2018 at Bellator 210. He won the fight via submission in the first round.

Salter faced Costello van Steenis on November 8, 2019 at Bellator 233. Salter outlasted van Steenis and won the bout unanimous decision, becoming the first time that Salter went to the judges.

Salter faced Andrew Kapel on August 21, 2020 at Bellator 244. Salter won the bout via arm-triangle choke in the third round.

Salter faced Gegard Mousasi  for the Bellator Middleweight Championship on August 13, 2021 at Bellator 264. After having success with his takedowns in the first two rounds, Salter ultimately lost the bout via TKO in round three.

Salter faced Johnny Eblen on March 12, 2022 at Bellator 276. He lost the bout via unanimous decision.

Salter is scheduled to face Aaron Jeffrey on March 31, 2023 at Bellator 293.

Championships and accomplishments

Brazilian Ju-jitsu
2017 ADCC West Coast Trials Winner

Mixed martial arts
Bellator MMA
Most submission wins in Bellator Middleweight division history (six)
Aggression Fighting Championship
AFC Middleweight Championship (One time)

Wrestling/Grappling
2017 ADCC West Coast Trials Winner
2007 NAIA National Champion Wrestler for Lindenwood University, MO
2007 All American Wrestler for Lindenwood University, MO
NAGA (North American Grappling Association) National Champion 
Casca-Grossa Champion in professional division
UEP Professional Middle Weight Title Holder - 2009
2002 State Champion Wrestler for Gardendale High School, Alabama

Mixed martial arts record

|-
| Loss
| align=center|18–6
| Johnny Eblen
| Decision (unanimous)
| Bellator 276
| 
| align=center|3 
| align=center|5:00 
| St. Louis, Missouri, United States
|
|-
|Loss
|align=center|18–5
|Gegard Mousasi
|TKO (punches)
|Bellator 264
|
|align=center|3
|align=center|2:07
|Uncasville, Connecticut, United States
|
|-
|Win
|align=center|18–4
|Andrew Kapel
|Submission (arm-triangle choke)
|Bellator 244 
|
|align=center|3
|align=center|3:11
|Uncasville, Connecticut, United States 
|
|-
| Win
| align=center| 17–4
| Costello van Steenis
| Decision (unanimous)
| Bellator 233
| 
| align=center| 3
| align=center| 5:00
| Thackerville, Oklahoma, United States
| 
|-
| Win
| align=center| 16–4
| Chidi Njokuani
| Submission (rear-naked choke)
| Bellator 210
| 
| align=center| 1
| align=center| 4:32
| Thackerville, Oklahoma, United States
|
|-
| Loss
| align=center| 15–4
| Rafael Lovato Jr.
| Submission (rear-naked choke)
| Bellator 205
| 
| align=center| 3
| align=center| 4:27
| Boise, Idaho, United States
| 
|-
| Win
| align=center| 15–3
| Jason Radcliffe
| Submission (rear-naked choke)
| Bellator 188
| 
| align=center| 1
| align=center| 1:55
| Tel Aviv, Israel
| 
|-
| Win
| align=center| 14–3
| Kendall Grove
| Technical Submission (rear-naked choke)
| Bellator 181
| 
| align=center| 1
| align=center| 4:37
| Thackerville, Oklahoma, United States
| 
|-
| Win
| align=center| 13–3
| Claudio Annicchiarico
| TKO (punches)
| Bellator 168
| 
| align=center| 1
| align=center| 1:40
| Florence, Italy
| 
|-
| Win
| align=center| 12–3
| Brandon Halsey
| Submission (triangle choke)
| Bellator 156
| 
| align=center| 1
| align=center| 4:03
| Fresno, California, United States
| 
|-
| Win
| align=center| 11–3
| Dustin Jacoby
| Submission (rear-naked choke)
| Bellator 132
| 
| align=center| 2
| align=center| 3:33
| Temecula, California, United States
| 
|-
| Win
| align=center| 10–3
| Jaime Jara 
| Submission (triangle choke)
| TWC 18: Halloween Havoc 3
| 
| align=center| 1
| align=center| 2:20
| Porterville, California, United States
| 
|-
| Win
| align=center| 9–3
| Fred Weaver
| TKO (punches)
| Strikehard 23
| 
| align=center| 1
| align=center| 2:58
| Tuscaloosa, Alabama, United States
| 
|-
| Loss
| align=center| 8–3
| Reggie Peña 
| Submission (guillotine choke)
| XFC 18: Music City Mayhem
| 
| align=center| 2
| align=center| 0:36
| Nashville, Tennessee, United States
| 
|-
| Win
| align=center| 8–2
| Ryan Machan
| Submission (rear-naked choke)
| PFC 8
| 
| align=center| 1
| align=center| 2:47
| Red Deer, Alberta, Canada
| 
|-
| Win
| align=center| 7–2
| Kalib Starnes
| KO (punches)
| AFC 6: Conviction
| 
| align=center| 2
| align=center| 4:13
| Victoria, British Columbia, Canada
| 
|-
| Win
| align=center| 6–2
| Casey Huffman
| TKO (punches)
| Strikeforce Challengers: Woodley vs. Saffiedine
| 
| align=center| 1
| align=center| 2:59
| Nashville, Tennessee, United States
| 
|-
| Loss
| align=center| 5–2
| Dan Miller
| Submission (ninja choke)
| UFC 118
| 
| align=center| 2
| align=center| 1:53
| Boston, Massachusetts, United States
| 
|-
| Win
| align=center| 5–1
| Jason MacDonald
| TKO (leg injury)
| UFC 113
| 
| align=center| 1
| align=center| 2:42
| Montreal, Quebec, Canada
| 
|-
| Loss
| align=center| 4–1
| Gerald Harris
| TKO (punches)
| UFC Fight Night: Maynard vs. Diaz
| 
| align=center| 3
| align=center| 3:24
| Fairfax, Virginia, United States
| 
|-
| Win
| align=center| 4–0
| Jeremiah Riggs
| TKO (punches)
| CCCW: The 3rd Degree
| 
| align=center| 1
| align=center| 4:44
| Springfield, Illinois, United States
| 
|-
| Win
| align=center| 3–0
| James Hammortree
| Submission (arm-triangle choke)
| Ultimate Event Promotions: Vendetta
| 
| align=center| 3
| align=center| 1:58
| Daphne, Alabama, United States
| 
|-
| Win
| align=center| 2–0
| Roberto Traven
| KO (punches)
| Adrenaline MMA 3: Bragging Rights
| 
| align=center| 1
| align=center| 2:15
| Birmingham, Alabama, United States
| 
|-
| Win
| align=center| 1–0
| Patrick Mandio
| Submission (armbar)
| KOTC: Invincible
| 
| align=center| 1
| align=center| 4:35
| Atlanta, Georgia, United States
|

See also
List of male mixed martial artists
List of current Bellator fighters

References

External links
 Official Website
 
 

1985 births
Living people
American male mixed martial artists
Mixed martial artists utilizing collegiate wrestling
Mixed martial artists utilizing Brazilian jiu-jitsu
American practitioners of Brazilian jiu-jitsu
People awarded a black belt in Brazilian jiu-jitsu
American male sport wrestlers
Sportspeople from Tuscaloosa, Alabama
People from Gardendale, Alabama
Lindenwood University alumni
Ultimate Fighting Championship male fighters